Lilian Mutuuzo (born 22 December 2002) is a Ugandan footballer who plays as a forward for FUFA Women Super League club Kampala Queens and the Uganda women's national team.

Club career 
Mutuuzo has played for Kampala Queens in Uganda.

International career 
Mutuuzo capped for Uganda at senior level during the 2018 CECAFA Women's Championship.

References 

2002 births
Living people
Ugandan women's footballers
Women's association football forwards
Uganda women's international footballers
21st-century Ugandan women